London Town is the second studio album by British rapper Kano, released on 10 September 2007 by 679 Artists. It features guest appearances by Damon Albarn, Vybz Kartel, Craig David, Kate Nash and Leo the Lion. Three singles were released to support the album: "Buss It Up" featuring Kartel, "This Is the Girl" featuring David and "Feel Free" featuring Albarn. London Town debuted at number 14 on the UK Albums Chart.

Singles
The first single, "Buss It Up" featuring Vybz Kartel, was released on 11 December 2006. The second single, "This Is the Girl" featuring Craig David, was released on 27 August 2007. The third and final single, "Feel Free" featuring Damon Albarn, was released on 10 December 2007.

Track listing

Sample credits
"Me & My Microphone" contains an interpolation of "Juicy" by The Notorious B.I.G., and "Fake Love" by Tony Yayo.
"London Town" contains an interpolation of "Still D.R.E.", written and performed by Dr. Dre.
"Feel Free" contains an interpolation of "Made You Look", written and performed by Nas.
"This Is the Girl" contains an interpolation of the extended version of "Big Pimpin'", written and performed by Jay Z.
"Fightin' the Nation" contains an interpolation of "Police and Thieves", performed by Junior Murvin.
"Bad Boy" contains an interpolation of "Original Nuttah", performed by Shy FX.

Personnel
Credits adapted from AllMusic.

 Damon Albarn – piano, production, featured artist
 Josh Blair – engineering
 Don Corleone – production
 Jason Cox – Engineer
 Craig David – production, featured artist, background vocals
 Tom Elmhirst – mixing
 Steve Fitzmaurice – mixing
 Fraser T. Smith – production, bass, guitar, mixing
 Beni G – scratching
 Pete Hamza – piano
 Nick Ingman – string arrangements, string conductor
 Mikey J. – arrangement, production, featured artist, background vocals
 Matt Jones – photography
 Priscilla Jones – vocals
 Kano – primary artist, mixing, production
 Langdon School Kids – choir
 Chris Laurence – bass
 Mat Maitland – art direction
 Perry Mason – violin
 Kate Nash – featured artist
 Henry Parsley – programming
 Leo Bubba Taylor – drums
 Richard Thomas – management
 Vybz Kartel – featured artist
 Ivo Jan van der Werff – viola
 Jonathan Williams – cello
 Warren Zielinski – violin

Charts

Certifications

References

2007 albums
Kano (rapper) albums
679 Artists albums
Albums produced by Damon Albarn
Albums produced by Fraser T. Smith